Ronald Murray was a Scottish international rugby union player.

He also played for Cambridge University RFC.

His brother George was also capped for Scotland.

References
 Bath, Richard (ed.) The Scotland Rugby Miscellany (Vision Sports Publishing Ltd, 2007 )

Scottish rugby union players
Scotland international rugby union players